Virus of the Mind is the second studio album of the American melodic death metal band Starkill. Before its release in 2014, it was made available to preorder throughout an Indiegogo campaign.

Official music videos have been released for "Before Hope Fades" and "Breaking the Madness".

Track listing

Personnel

Starkill
Parker Jameson - vocals, guitars, keyboards, orchestrations
Spencer Weidner - drums
Tony Keathley - guitars
Shaun Andruchuk - bass

Guest/session musicians
James Malone - additional vocals (track 2)
Nedim Melkic - piano (track 7)

Production
Spencer Weidner - producer
Parker Jameson - producer
Charles Macak - producer, engineering, mixing, mastering
Kevin Doti - engineering
Nedim Melkic - engineering (assistant)
Ron Duffy - engineering (assistant)
Rusalka Design - artwork
Matt Foster - layout
Tom Hane - photography

References

2014 albums
Starkill albums
Century Media Records albums